The 1985 New York Jets season was the 26th season for the team and the 16th in the National Football League. It began with the team trying to improve upon its 7–9 record from 1984 under head coach Joe Walton. Among quarterbacks, Ken O'Brien had the lowest rate of interceptions, with only eight interceptions in 488 passing attempts. The Jets finished the season with a record of 11–5, qualifying for the top Wild Card spot in the playoffs. On October 14, during a Monday Night Halftime ceremony, the Jets retired Joe Namath's number 12, and helped inspire the Jets to a 23–7 victory over the Dolphins. In the playoffs, they fell at home to the division rival, and eventual AFC champion New England Patriots in the Wild Card round.

Personnel

Staff

Roster

Schedule

Regular season

Season summary

Week 7 at Patriots

Week 8 vs Seahawks

Standings

Playoffs

Awards and honors
Ken O'Brien, NFL passing leader (96.2 passer rating)

External links
1985 statistics

References

New York Jets seasons
New York Jets
New York Jets season
20th century in East Rutherford, New Jersey
Meadowlands Sports Complex